The 2012 Russia Open Grand Prix was the sixth grand prix gold and grand prix tournament of the 2012 BWF Grand Prix Gold and Grand Prix. The tournament was held in Sports Hall Olympic, Vladivostok, Russia June 26 until July 1, 2012, and had a total purse of $50,000.

Women's doubles

Seeds

  Valeria Sorokina / Nina Vislova (champion)
  Ozge Bayrak / Neslihan Yigit (withdrew)

Finals

Top half

Bottom half

Mixed doubles

Seeds

  Alexandr Nikolaenko / Valeria Sorokina (champion)
  Vitalij Durkin / Nina Vislova (final)

Finals

Top half

Bottom half

References

Open Grand Prix
Sport in Vladivostok
Russia Open Grand Prix
Russian Open (badminton)